Miłobądz railway station is a railway station serving the village of Miłobądz Mały in the Pomeranian Voivodeship, Poland. The station is located on the Warsaw–Gdańsk railway. The train services are operated by Przewozy Regionalne.

The station used to be known as Mühblanz.

A train crash took place here on 6 July 1972.

Modernisation
The station was modernised in 2010, which included rebuilding the platforms, renewing the tracks and the signalling system.

Train services
The station is served by the following services:

Regional services (R) Gdynia - Sopot - Gdansk - Tczew - Malbork - Elblag - Ilawa - Olsztyn
Regional services (R) Gdynia - Sopot - Gdansk - Tczew - Laskowice - Bydgoszcz

References

 This article is based upon a translation of the Polish language version as of October 2016.

External links

Railway stations in Pomeranian Voivodeship
Tczew County